The capelin or caplin (Mallotus villosus) is a small forage fish of the smelt family found in the North Atlantic, North Pacific and Arctic oceans. In summer, it grazes on dense swarms of plankton at the edge of the ice shelf. Larger capelin also eat a great deal of krill and other crustaceans. Among others, whales, seals, Atlantic cod, Atlantic mackerel, squid and seabirds prey on capelin, in particular during the spawning season while the capelin migrate south. Capelin spawn on sand and gravel bottoms or sandy beaches at the age of two to six years. When spawning on beaches, capelin have an extremely high post-spawning mortality rate which, for males, is close to 100%.
They are olive-coloured dorsally, shading to silver on sides. Males have a translucent ridge on both sides of their bodies. The ventral aspects of the males iridesce reddish at the time of spawn.

Capelin migration

Capelin populations in the Barents Sea and around Iceland perform extensive seasonal migrations. Barents Sea capelin migrate during winter and early spring to the coast of northern Norway (Finnmark) and the Kola Peninsula (Russia) for spawning. During summer and autumn, capelin migrate north- and north-eastward for feeding.

Icelandic capelin move inshore in large schools to spawn and migrate in spring and summer to feed in the plankton-rich oceanic area between Iceland, Greenland, and Jan Mayen. Capelin distribution and migration is linked with ocean currents and water masses. Around Iceland, maturing capelin usually undertake extensive northward feeding migrations in spring and summer, and the return migration takes place in September to November. The spawning migration starts from north of Iceland in December to January. In a paper published in 2009, researchers from Iceland recounted their application of an interacting particle model to the capelin stock around Iceland, successfully predicting the spawning migration route for 2008.

Reproduction

As an r-selected species, capelin have a high reproductive potential and an intrinsic population growth rate. They reproduce by spawning and their main spawning season occurs in spring but can extend into the summer. The majority of capelin are three or four years old when they spawn. The males migrate directly to the shallow water of fjords, where spawning will take place, while the females remain in deeper water until they are completely mature. Once the females are mature, they migrate to the spawning grounds and spawn. This process usually takes place at night. Although some other fish species leave their eggs in locations that dry out (a few, such as plainfin midshipman, may even remain on land with the eggs during low tide) or on plants above the water (splash tetras), jumping onto land en masse to spawn is unique to the capelin, grunions, and grass puffer. After the female capelins have spawned, they immediately leave the spawning grounds and can spawn again in the following years if they survive. The males do not leave the spawning grounds and potentially spawn more than once throughout the season. Male capelin are considered to be semelparous because they die soon after the spawning season is over.

Fisheries

Capelin is an important forage fish, and is essential as the key food of the Atlantic cod. The northeast Atlantic cod and capelin fisheries, therefore, are managed by a multispecies approach developed by the main resource owners Norway and Russia.

In some years with large quantities of Atlantic herring in the Barents Sea, capelin seem to be heavily affected. Probably both food competition and herring feeding on capelin larvae lead to collapses in the capelin stock. In some years, though good recruitment of capelin despite a high herring biomass suggests that herring are only one factor influencing capelin dynamics.

In the provinces of Quebec (particularly in the Gaspé peninsula) and Newfoundland and Labrador in Canada, it is a regular summertime practice for locals to go to the beach and scoop the capelin up in nets or whatever is available, as the capelin "roll in" in the millions each year at the end of May or in early June.

Commercially, capelin is used for fish meal and oil industry products, but is also appreciated as food. The flesh is agreeable in flavour, resembling herring. Capelin roe (masago) is considered a high-value product in Japan. It is also sometimes mixed with wasabi or green food colouring and wasabi flavour and sold as "wasabi caviar". Often, masago is commercialised as ebiko and used as a substitute for tobiko, flying fish roe, owing to its similar appearance and taste, although the mouthfeel is different due to the individual eggs being smaller and less crunchy than tobiko.

Notes

References
 Capelin off Iceland: Biology, exploitation and management

Commercial fish
Fish of the Arctic Ocean
Canadian cuisine
Greenlandic cuisine
Osmeridae
Fish described in 1776